Internet intervention, in medical context, refers to the delivery of health care-related treatments through Internet.

References 

Medicine
Therapy
Internet